The Royal Ultra Sky Marathon (also known as Royal Gran Paradiso), is an international skyrunning competition held for the first time in 2008. It runs every two years (the SkyRace from 2011) in Ceresole Reale (Italy) in July and consists of two races, the Ultra is valid for the Skyrunner World Series.

Races
 Royal Ultra Sky Marathon, an Ultra SkyMarathon (55 km / 4,141 m vertical climb)
 Roc Sky Race, a SkyRace (31 km / 2,000 m vertical climb)

Royal Ultra Sky Marathon

Roc Sky Race

See also 
 Skyrunner World Series
 Gran Paradiso National Park

References

External links 
 Official web site

Skyrunning competitions
Skyrunner World Series
2008 establishments in Italy
Recurring sporting events established in 2008
Sport in Piedmont
Athletics competitions in Italy